Nosrat Rahmani (نصرت رحمانی;  in Persian;  (March 1, 1930 – June 16, 2000) was an Iranian poet and writer .

Life
Rahmani was born in the slums of Tehran. He received his college degree from Ministry of PTT. After just a few years of services in the Ministry, Nosrat Rahmani sought employment with the state radio.
Subsequently he abandoned government employment for journalism and freelance writing.

Poetry
His poetry is the poetry of the stubborn, humiliated and revolting down-town people in Tehran's slums; he never forgets his concern for the plight of the urban poor. His memoirs entitled, The Man Lost in the Dust (1957), provide an emotional account of the life of an addict. During the 1960s and 1970s, Rahmani was especially popular among the youth. As a whole, his poetry is dramatic in structure and fantastic in effect, often attempting to recapture the past by poeticizing its recollections.

Death
He died in Rasht  in June 2000 at the age of 70.

Works

Migration and Desert

Cashmere

Rendezvous in the Slime

The Burning of Wind

Harvest, Sword

the Darling of the Pen

The Goblet Made Another Round

References

External links 

1930 births
2000 deaths
20th-century Iranian poets